Nationality words link to articles with information on the nation's poetry or literature (for instance, Irish or France).

Events
May 26 – Matsuo Bashō begins the journey described in Oku no Hosomichi ("Narrow road to the interior") on which he visits Kisakata, and later composes a waka about Kisakata's islands.
Thomas Shadwell becomes Poet Laureate of England.

Works published

Great Britain
 Aphra Behn, The History of the Nun; or, The Fair Vow-Breaker, Behn died on April 16 of this year
 Charles Cotton, Poems on Several Occasions
 Robert Gould, Poems
 Nathaniel Lee, On the Death of Mrs Behn, Aphra Behn died on April 16 of this year

Other
 Michael Wigglesworth, Riddles Unriddled; or, Christian Paradoxes, a poem published in the 14th edition of Meat Out of the Eater, English Colonial America

Births
Death years link to the corresponding "[year] in poetry" article:
 February 25 – Khushal Khattaktak (born 1613), Pashtun warrior, poet and tribal chief
 May 3 (bapt.) – William Broome (died 1745), English poet and translator
 May 15 – Lady Mary Wortley Montagu (died 1762), English aristocrat and writer
 November 18 – Shah Abdul Latif Bhittai (died 1752), Sufi scholar and saint, poet of the Sindhi language

Deaths
Birth years link to the corresponding "[year] in poetry" article:
 January – William Chamberlayne (born c.1619), English poet and playwright
 April 16 – Aphra Behn (born 1640), English woman playwright and poet
 August 21 – William Cleland (born 1661), Scottish poet and soldier, killed at Battle of Dunkeld
 October 4 – Quirinus Kuhlmann (born 1651), German Baroque poet and mystic, burned at the stake
 December 13 – Zbigniew Morsztyn (born 1628), Polish poet
 date unknown – Gwilym Puw (born 1626), Welsh Catholic poet and Royalist officer

See also

 Poetry
 17th century in poetry
 17th century in literature
 Restoration literature

Notes

17th-century poetry
Poetry